Sir Thomas Antonio Reginald Terrell (18 January 1889 – 5 February 1979) was a British Conservative politician, MP for Henley (UK Parliament constituency) from 1918 until 1924.  Prior to becoming an MP he served in the First World War.  He was knighted in 1959.

He was born in Mortlake, Surrey, the son of George Terrell and his wife, Mary Terrell. Unusually, he and his father both sat in Parliament at the same time, with his father representing Chippenham from 1910 until 1922.

References

External links 
 

1889 births
1979 deaths
Knights Bachelor
Conservative Party (UK) MPs for English constituencies
UK MPs 1918–1922
UK MPs 1922–1923
UK MPs 1923–1924
British military personnel of World War I